Mach a Šebestová (in English: Mach and Šebestová or Max and Sally) is a Czech cartoon series. It was created by writer Miloš Macourek, director Jaroslav Doubrava, and animator Adolf Born. The animated characters were voiced by Petr Nárožný. The animation is produced in a studio of Barrandov under Bratri v triku/Kratky Film Praha/Ustredni Pujcovna Filmu mark (later Bonton acquired and distributed the old episodes as of today). The story follows the adventures of two third-year pupils and a torn off telephone receiver. The first series of 13 episodes was broadcast on Czechoslovak Television in 1982. Mach a Šebestová is one of the most popular series made for children's television programme Večerníček. The cartoon was adapted for the film Mach, Šebestová a kouzelné sluchátko (Max, Sally and the Magic Phone, 2001) by director Václav Vorlíček. In 2010, Theatre Lampion presented a stage adaptation of the series in the Czech National theatre.

Synopsis 
Ordinary schoolchildren Mach and Šebestová become extraordinary thanks to a donated magic phone receiver. The receiver fulfils their wishes, allows them to visit various places and encounter interesting and unusual situations. During their adventures, the pupils are usually followed by a friendly dog named Jonatán, and they often meet with its owner, Mrs Kadrnožková. Mach and Šebestová attend school and the stories are often associated with the school setting. Two of their classmates, poor students and incorrigible urchins Horáček and Pažout, are the main antagonists of the series.

List of episodes

First series (1982) 
 O utrženém sluchátku (About A Torn Off Receiver)
 Školní výlet (School Trip)
 Člověk neandrtálský (Neanderthal Man)
 Kropáček má anginu (Kropacek Has a Sore Throat)
 Zoologická zahrada (The Zoological Garden)
 Přírodní zákony (Laws of Nature)
 Piráti (Pirates)
 Vzorné chování (Exemplary Behaviour)
 Policejní pes (Police Dog)
 Páni tvorstva (Masters of Creation)
 Oběť pro kamaráda (A Sacrifice For a Friend)
 Jak Mach a Šebestová hlídali dítě (Mach and Sebestova As Baby-Sitters)
 Ukradené sluchátko (The Stolen Receiver)

Mach a Šebestová na prázdninách (1999) 
 Jak Mach a Šebestová jeli na prázdniny
 Jak Jonatán chytil blechu
 Jak Mach a Šebestová udělali z dědečka Tarzana
 Jak Mach a Šebestová prožili deštivé odpoledne
 Jak Mach a Šebestová udělali z malíře Kolouška žáka Leonarda da Vinci
 Jak Mach a Šebestová poslali lístek paní Kadrnožkové
 Jak Mach a Šebestová potrestali paní Tláskalovou
 Jak Mach a Šebestová zavinili zmizení Lukáše Tůmy
 Jak Mach a Šebestová splnili životní sen paní Janderové
 Jak Šebestovi přijeli za dcerou na víkend
 Jak Mach a Šebestová navštívili cirkus
 Jak se stal Jonatán hrdinou dne
 Jak se Mach a Šebestová vrátili z prázdnin

Mach a Šebestová na cestách (2005) 
 Jak Mach a Šebestová závodili s domorodým kouzelníkem - November 19, 2005
 Jak se Mach a Šebestová koupali v Amazonce  - November 20, 2005
 Jak Mach a Šebestová navštívili severní pól - November 21, 2005
 Jak Mach a Šebestová zachraňovali v Paříži tetu Vilmu - November 22, 2005
 Jak se Mach a Šebestová potápěli u Havajských ostrovů - November 23, 2005
 Jak Mach a Šebestová zachránili v Benátkách Horáčka s Pažoutem - November 24, 2005
 Jak Mach a Šebestová hledali v Austrálii Jonatána - November 25, 2005
 Jak Mach a Šebestová navštívili s Jonatánem Hollywood - November 26, 2005

Other languages
 Hindi - Broadcast in India on DD National channel as Chamatkari Telephone. The title characters are named Sally, Mac, and a dog Jonathan.

References

External links 
 Mach And Sebestova - Come Up To the Blackboard! (Krátký film Praha)
 

Czech animated television series
Czech children's television series
Czechoslovak television series
1982 Czechoslovak television series debuts
Fictional Czech people
1980s Czechoslovak television series
1990s Czech television series
Czechoslovak Television original programming